[[Image:Asv-koeln-1997-donovan-bailey.jpg|250px|right|thumb|Athlete Donovan Bailey was Times Canadian Newsmaker of the Year in 1996.]]
The Canadian Newsmaker of the Year was a designation awarded by the Canadian edition of Time magazine.  It came with a written piece reflecting the magazine's staff's opinion on which Canadian or Canadians have had the most impact on the news, either positively or negatively. The honour has also been known by the title Canada's Newsmaker, or by titles such as "Headliners" and simply "Newsmakers" which were shared with non-Canadians.  However, the exact phrase "Canadian Newsmaker of the Year" has been used by Time. This selection is not to be confused with the Canadian Press' separate selection of a Canadian Newsmaker of the Year, or with Time's overall Person of the Year.

Time'''s practice of selecting a Canadian Newsmaker of the Year began in 1995.  Columnist Robert Fulford has speculated that the point was to try "gesturing politely to Canadian readers". In early years, the selection received a short article within a list of other international newsmakers.  Thus, the 1995 newsmaker was found under the title "Headliners: Canada" and in subsequent years phrases like "Others Who Shaped 1997", "Others Who Shaped 1999", and "Newsmakers 2000" were used.  Since 2001 the selection has been accompanied by a fuller article, and interviews with the subjects have also appeared (for example, in 2001 and 2002, but not 2003).  Still, the press has noted that even with the Canadian edition of Time, it was the Person of the Year rather than the Canadian Newsmaker who was pictured on the cover of the issue. 
It has not been awarded since the discontinuation of Times Canadian edition in 2008.

The selections have been at the centre of other cases of media attention and debate.  For example, the Montreal Gazette said of the project in general that it was initially "dull" in favouring seemingly conventional men, but that 2003 provided a refreshing selection of two homosexual men and commentary on liberalism in Canada.  The Gazette'' took this as recognition from a US magazine that Canadians are distinct from Americans. All awardees were people, except in 2007 when the Canadian Dollar was named the Canadian Newsmaker of the Year. There was never a woman selected as Canadian Newsmaker of the Year.

List of newsmakers

See also

Canadian Newsmaker of the Year (Canadian Press)
Persons of National Historic Significance (Canada)
List of inductees of Canada's Walk of Fame
The Greatest Canadian

References

Canadian awards
Canadian journalism
Time (magazine)